Michael Wayne Speight (born 24 February 1962) is a former New Zealand rugby union player. A lock, Speight represented Waikato, North Auckland and North Harbour at a provincial level, and was a member of the New Zealand national side, the All Blacks, in 1986. He played five matches for the All Blacks, including one international against Australia.

References

1962 births
Living people
Rugby union players from Auckland
University of Waikato alumni
New Zealand rugby union players
New Zealand international rugby union players
Waikato rugby union players
Northland rugby union players
North Harbour rugby union players
Rugby union locks
People educated at Whangarei Boys' High School